Saint Anthony the Abbot Seminary is a seminary in charge of preparing priests for the Archdiocese of Cuzco. It is based in Cuzco, Peru, and can be considered among the oldest in the American continent (1598). It is named after Saint Anthony the Abbot.

A Spanish delegation was sent to the Seminary in 1899 to reform the school's administration. Under the government of Augusto B. Leguía, the seminary was again reformed with the intention to make it more americanized.

See also
National University of Saint Anthony the Abbot in Cuzco

References

Spanish Colonial architecture in Peru
Catholic seminaries
Buildings and structures in Cusco